Fútbol Sala Martorell was a futsal club based in Martorell, province of Barcelona, Catalonia, Spain.

The club was founded in 1985 and played at the Pavelló Municipal, with a capacity of 2,000.

The club was sponsored by the Ajuntament of Martorell.

Season to season

10 seasons in División de Honor
3 seasons in División de Plata
4 seasons in 1ª Nacional A
2 seasons in 1ª Nacional B

Notable players
 Jordi Torras
 Fernandao

External links
Profile at LNFS.es

Catalan futsal clubs
Futsal clubs established in 1985
Sports clubs disestablished in 2011
1985 establishments in Spain
2011 disestablishments in Spain